The 2018 Major League Baseball postseason was the playoff tournament of Major League Baseball for the 2018 season. The winners of the League Division Series would move on to the League Championship Series to determine the pennant winners that face each other in the World Series.

In the American League, the Boston Red Sox and Cleveland Indians made their third straight appearances, the Houston Astros and New York Yankees made their second straight appearances, and the Oakland Athletics made their fourth appearance in the past seven years. This postseason was notable for being the first in which the American League had three teams that won at least 100 games or more in the regular season.

In the National League, the Los Angeles Dodgers made their sixth straight postseason appearance, the Colorado Rockies made their second straight appearance, the Chicago Cubs made their fourth straight appearance, the Atlanta Braves made their first appearance since 2013, and the Milwaukee Brewers made their first appearance since 2011.

The postseason began on October 2, and ended on October 28, with the Red Sox defeating the Dodgers in five games in the 2018 World Series. It was the ninth title won by the Red Sox organization, tying the Oakland Athletics for the third most World Series championships.

Playoff seeds
The following teams qualified for the postseason:

American League
 Boston Red Sox - 108–54, Clinched AL East
 Houston Astros - 103–59, Clinched AL West
 Cleveland Indians - 91–71, Clinched AL Central
 New York Yankees - 100–62
 Oakland Athletics - 97–65

National League
 Milwaukee Brewers - 96–67, Clinched NL Central
 Los Angeles Dodgers - 92–71, Clinched NL West
 Atlanta Braves - 90–72, Clinched NL East
 Chicago Cubs - 95–68
 Colorado Rockies - 91–72

Playoff bracket

American League Wild Card

(4) New York Yankees vs. (5) Oakland Athletics 

This was the fourth postseason meeting between the Athletics and Yankees. The Yankees had won the previous three meetings (1981, 2000, 2001). The Yankees defeated the Athletics 7-2 to advance to the ALDS for the second year in a row.

National League Wild Card

(4) Chicago Cubs vs. (5) Colorado Rockies 

The Rockies upset the Cubs in a 13-inning duel, 2-1, to advance to the NLDS for the first time since 2007.

American League Division Series

(1) Boston Red Sox vs. (4) New York Yankees 

This was the fourth postseason meeting in the history of the Yankees-Red Sox rivalry. They had last met in the 2004 ALCS, where the Red Sox became the first team in MLB history to win a series after facing a 3-0 series deficit. The Red Sox again defeated the Yankees to advance to the ALCS for the first time since 2013. The Red Sox took Game 1 by one run, but the Yankees evened the series with a 6-2 victory in Game 2. Game 3 was the most notable matchup of the series, as the Red Sox blew out the Yankees 16-1 in Yankee Stadium, handing the Yankees their worst postseason loss ever. The Red Sox took a 4-0 lead in Game 4, and while the Yankees cut their lead to one in the bottom of the ninth, the Red Sox still held on to close out the series.

The Yankees and Red Sox would meet once more in the 2021 AL Wild Card Game, which was won by the Red Sox at Fenway Park.

(2) Houston Astros vs. (3) Cleveland Indians 

The Astros swept the Indians to return to the ALCS for the second year in a row. The series was not close - the Astros took Game 1 in a blowout, and won Game 2 by a 3-1 score. The Astros completed the sweep with a blowout victory in Game 3 in Cleveland.

This was the last postseason appearance for the Indians until 2020.

National League Division Series

(1) Milwaukee Brewers vs. (5) Colorado Rockies 

The Brewers swept the Rockies to return to the NLCS for the first time since 2011. The Rockies were simply outmatched by the Brewers' offense and pitching, aside from a close extra-innings duel in Game 1, the Brewers took games 2 and 3 in shutouts to move on to the NLCS.

As of 2022, this is the last time the Rockies appeared in the postseason.

(2) Los Angeles Dodgers vs. (3) Atlanta Braves 

This was the third postseason meeting between these two teams. The Dodgers defeated  the Braves in four games to return to the NLCS for the third year in a row. The Braves were shut out in Games 1 and 2, but managed to win Game 3 by one run. However, the Dodgers won Game 4 to close out the series and move on to the NLCS.

The Braves and Dodgers would face each other two more times in the postseason - in the NLCS in 2020 and 2021, with the Dodgers winning the former, and the Braves winning the latter.

American League Championship Series

(1) Boston Red Sox vs. (2) Houston Astros 

This was the second postseason meeting between the Astros and Red Sox. Despite Houston taking Game 1 on the road, the Red Sox came back to win the next four games and the AL pennant. The Red Sox returned to the World Series for the first time since 2013. As of 2022, this is the last time the Red Sox won the AL pennant.

The Astros would return to the ALCS the next year, where they defeated the New York Yankees in six games to return to the World Series.

National League Championship Series

(1) Milwaukee Brewers vs. (2) Los Angeles Dodgers 

This was the first postseason meeting between the Brewers and Dodgers. The Dodgers narrowly defeated the Brewers in seven games to return to the World Series for the second year in a row.

The Dodgers' win was marred by controversy, as the team was accused by the Brewers' Eric Kratz of using a video camera to steal signs. An anonymous source reported to The Athletic that "They use video people to get sequences", and that "It's known throughout the league. MLB knows it's an issue." Kratz also pointed to a moment in the sixth inning of Game 5 when he saw Manny Machado motioning toward Chris Taylor, who was at the plate in what he thought was an attempt to inform him of the upcoming pitch.

2018 World Series

(AL1) Boston Red Sox vs. (NL2) Los Angeles Dodgers 

This was a rematch of the 1916 World Series, which the Red Sox won in five games. Like in that series 102 years ago, history again repeated itself, and the Red Sox defeated the Dodgers in five quick games to win their ninth World Series title in franchise history. This series was known for its Game 3, which the Dodgers won after 18 innings of play, 3-2. Game 3 became the longest World Series game ever played, and was longer than the entirety of the 1939 World Series. To date, this is the last World Series to feature any games that went into extra innings.

Like the Astros in the 2017 World Series, the Red Sox after winning this World Series were then marred by a scandal. On January 7, 2020, the Red Sox were implicated in a sign stealing scandal (the team had previously been fined in 2017 for sign stealing) after three unnamed team members told The Athletic that the Red Sox had used their replay room to steal signs of opposing teams during the 2018 season. On January 13, 2020, Manfred stated that he would determine the appropriate punishment for Red Sox manager Alex Cora, who was also implicated in the Astros scandal, when the investigation was completed. The next day, Cora and the Red Sox mutually agreed to part ways and it was announced he would be suspended for the full season. A few days after his season long suspension ended, Cora was re-hired by the team.

The Dodgers would return to the World Series in 2020, which they won in six games over the Tampa Bay Rays.

References

External links
 League Baseball Standings & Expanded Standings - 2018

 
Major League Baseball postseason